The 1906 County Championship was the 17th officially organised running of the County Championship, and ran from 3 May to 30 August 1906. Kent won its first championship title, while the previous season's winners, Yorkshire, finished in second place.

Table
 One point was awarded for a win, and one point was taken away for each loss. Final placings were decided by dividing the number of points earned by the number of completed matches (i.e. those that ended in a win or a loss), and multiplying by 100.

Records

Batting

See also
1906 English cricket season
Kent County Cricket Club in 1906

References

1906 in English cricket
County Championship seasons
County